The Canadian province of Alberta has 379 school authorities, which are sometimes referred to as school boards, school districts, or school divisions. Types include public school, separate school and francophone school authorities. There are also charter schools and private schools that act as their own authorities, as well as schools under the authority of early childhood services (ECS), private operators, and Federal Indian Affairs. Alberta's school authorities report to Alberta Education.

School authority types

Public 
Alberta has 42 public school authorities.
Aspen View Public School Division No. 78
Battle River Regional Division No. 31
Black Gold Regional Division No. 18
Buffalo Trail Public Schools Regional Division No. 28
Calgary School District No. 19
Canadian Rockies Regional Division No. 12
Chinook's Edge School Division No. 73
Clearview School Division No. 71
Edmonton School District No. 7
Elk Island Public Schools Regional Division No. 14
Foothills School Division No. 38
Fort McMurray Public School District No. 2833
Fort Vermilion School Division No. 52
Golden Hills School Division No. 75
Grande Prairie School District No. 2357
Grande Yellowhead Public School Division No. 77
Grasslands Regional Division No. 6
High Prairie School Division No. 48
Horizon School Division No. 67
Lethbridge School District No. 51
Livingstone Range School Division No. 68
Lloydminster Public School Division
Medicine Hat School District No. 76
Northern Gateway Regional Division No. 10
Northern Lights School Division No. 69
Northland School Division No. 61
Palliser Regional Division No. 26
Parkland School Division No. 70
Peace River School Division No. 10
Peace Wapiti School Division No. 76
Pembina Hills Regional Division No. 7
Prairie Land Regional Division No. 25
Prairie Rose School Division No. 8
Red Deer Public School District No. 104
Rocky View School Division No. 41
St. Albert Public School District No. 5565
St. Paul Education Regional Division No. 1
Sturgeon School Division No. 24
Westwind School Division No. 74
Wetaskiwin Regional Division No. 11
Wild Rose School Division No. 66
Wolf Creek School Division No. 72

Private 

Alberta has 153 private school authorities.

Separate 
Alberta has 17 separate school authorities.
Calgary Roman Catholic Separate School District No. 1
Christ the Redeemer Catholic Separate Regional Division No. 3
East Central Alberta Catholic Separate Schools Regional Division No. 16
Edmonton Catholic Separate School District No. 7
Elk Island Catholic Separate Regional Division No. 41
Evergreen Catholic Separate Regional Division No. 2
Fort McMurray Roman Catholic Separate School Division No. 32
Grande Prairie Roman Catholic Separate School District No. 28
Greater St. Albert Roman Catholic Separate School District No. 734
Holy Family Catholic Regional Division No. 37
Holy Spirit Roman Catholic Separate Regional Division No. 4
Lakeland Roman Catholic Separate School District No. 150
Living Waters Catholic Regional Division No. 42
Lloydminster Roman Catholic Separate School Division
Medicine Hat Catholic Separate Regional Division No. 20
Red Deer Catholic Regional Division No. 39
St. Thomas Aquinas Roman Catholic Separate Regional Division No. 38

Francophone 
After a 1990 Supreme Court decision, based on the Canadian Charter of Rights and Freedoms minority language rights provisions, Alberta established francophone school authorities to allow francophone communities to administer their own schools, and provide French language instruction, wherever numbers warrant.

Alberta has four francophone school authorities.
East Central Francophone Education Region No. 3
Greater North Central Francophone Education Region No. 2
Northwest Francophone Education Region No. 1
The Southern Francophone Education Region No. 4

Charter 

Charter schools are independent of district school authorities. Each has its own board with powers similar to a district authority, but limited to a single school.

Alberta has 13 charter school authorities.
Almadina School Society
Aurora School Ltd.
Boyle Street Education Centre
Calgary Arts Academy Society
Calgary Girls' School Society
CAPE - Centre for Academic and Personal Excellence Institute
Connect Charter School Society
Foundations for the Future Charter Academy Charter School Society
Mother Earth's Children's Charter School Society
New Horizons Charter School Society
Suzuki Charter School Society
Valhalla School Foundation
Westmount Charter School Society

See also 
Public School Boards' Association of Alberta
Ukrainian Bilingual Program

References 

Education in Alberta

School authorities
Alberta